Salt Creek is a  stream in northeastern Illinois. It is an important tributary of the Des Plaines River, part of the Illinois River and ultimately the Mississippi River watersheds. It rises in northwest Cook County at Wilke Marsh in Palatine and flows in a meandering course generally southward through DuPage County, returning to central Cook County and emptying into the Des Plaines River in Riverside, Illinois. Most of the creek's watershed is urbanized, densely populated and flood-prone.

Flood control dams were constructed along the creek in 1978 within the Ned Brown Forest Preserve near Elk Grove Village, Illinois, creating the  Busse Lake.

Tributary streams include Addison Creek.  The Graue Mill historic gristmill stands on the bank of the creek in Oak Brook.

It was originally known to European settlers as the Little Des Plaines River but was given the name Salt Creek in the mid-nineteenth century after a large wagonload of salt spilled in the waterway. Some of the species of fish in the creek include carp, smallmouth bass, northern pike, bluegill/sunfish minnow/shad, and bullhead catfish.

See also
List of Illinois rivers
Forest Preserve District of DuPage County

References

External links

Salt Creek Watershed Network

Tributaries of the Illinois River
Rivers of Illinois
Rivers of Cook County, Illinois
Bodies of water of DuPage County, Illinois